Peschl is a surname. Notable people with the surname include:

 Ernst Peschl (1906–1986), German mathematician
 Markus F. Peschl (born 1965), Austrian philosopher of mind
 Noemi Peschl (born 2000), Swiss synchronized swimmer